Mordellistena pseudorhenana is a species of beetle in the genus Mordellistena of the family Mordellidae. It was described by Ermisch in 1977 and is endemic to Hungary.

References

Beetles described in 1977
pseudorhenana
Endemic fauna of Hungary